Bruno Alexandre Vilela Gama (born 15 November 1987) is a Portuguese professional footballer who plays as a right winger for Cypriot club AEK Larnaca FC.

He amassed Primeira Liga totals of 129 matches and 11 goals over seven seasons, mainly representing Vitória de Setúbal and Rio Ave (two years apiece). Abroad, he played with Deportivo, Dnipro, Alcorcón and Aris.

Gama won 83 caps for Portugal all youth categories comprised, scoring 28 goals.

Club career

Portugal
Gama was born in Vila Verde, Braga District. A S.C. Braga youth graduate, he appeared aged 16 in his first Primeira Liga game, a 2–2 away draw against U.D. Leiria, being subsequently acquired by FC Porto in a €750,000 deal.

After spending most of his first seasons with the club's B side, Gama served another two top-division loans, at Braga in 2006–07– scoring in a 4–0 home win over FC Slovan Liberec in the group stage of the UEFA Cup– and Vitória de Setúbal the following two years.

In mid-July 2009, Gama was released by Porto and joined Rio Ave F.C. on a two-year contract. During his first season in Vila do Conde he was one of the few players to play all 30 league matches, contributing to a final 12th place in the top tier; he scored in home defeats of former side Setúbal (1–0) and Leixões SC (2–0).

Deportivo
As many compatriots during that timeframe, Gama signed for Spain's Deportivo de La Coruña on 27 July 2011, for an undisclosed fee. He contributed 29 games and seven goals in his first year, to help the Galicians win the Segunda División championship.

Gama made his debut in La Liga on 20 August 2012, playing the full 90 minutes in a 2–0 home victory over CA Osasuna.

Dnipro
On 20 August 2013, following Deportivo's relegation, Gama moved teams and countries again, joining FC Dnipro Dnipropetrovsk on a three-year contract. On 13 September of the following year, he scored a hat-trick in a 5–2 win at FC Metalist Kharkiv.

Gama made 16 appearances – all rounds included – to help his team reach the final of the 2015 Europa League against Sevilla FC, being an unused substitute in the 2–3 loss in Warsaw.

Alcorcón
On 17 February 2018, after a further two top-flight seasons with Deportivo, free agent Gama signed a short-term deal with AD Alcorcón. He scored his only goal for the latter on 3 June, helping the hosts defeat CF Reus Deportiu 3–0.

Aris
On 10 August 2018, Gama joined Aris Thessaloniki F.C. on a two-year contract for an undisclosed fee. Seventeen days later, in his Super League Greece debut, he scored in a 3–0 away win against PAS Lamia 1964.

Gama netted a career-best 12 goals in his second season, as the team from Thessaloniki came fifth and qualified for the Europa League; this included a brace on 6 June 2020 in a 3–1 home victory over OFI Crete FC. He subsequently extended his contract for two more years.

On 6 March 2022, in his 100th league appearance for the club, Gama closed the 2–1 defeat of Olympiakos F.C. at the Kleanthis Vikelidis Stadium, breaking the champions' undefeated streak after 25 games.

International career
Internationally, Gama first participated in the 2003 UEFA European Under-17 Championship, as Portugal emerged victorious on home soil. He also helped the team reach the quarter-finals in that year's FIFA World Cup held in Finland, scoring one goal against Cameroon.

Gama captained Portugal in the 2004 European Under-17 Championship, being crowned top scorer after netting three in five appearances and being essential as the national side took third place. In 2006 he appeared with the under-19s at the Under-19 European Championship, scoring in every game in the group stage.

Gama was part of the squad that took part in the 2007 FIFA U-20 World Cup, scoring two goals in the country's only win in the tournament – one from a free kick and the other from the penalty spot in a 2–0 win against New Zealand. In the ensuing Autumn he was called up to the under-21s and, in 2010, he played with the Olympic team in the 2009–11 International Challenge Trophy.

Personal life
Gama's older brother, Augusto, was also a footballer. He too represented Braga and Rio Ave.

Career statistics

Honours
Vitória Setúbal
Taça da Liga: 2007–08

Deportivo
Segunda División: 2011–12

Dnipro
UEFA Europa League runner-up: 2014–15

Portugal U17
UEFA European Under-17 Championship: 2003

Individual
UEFA European Under-17 Championship top scorer: 2004
FIFA U-20 World Cup All-Star Team: 2007
Primeira Liga Young Player of the Month: January 2009, May 2009

References

External links

 

1987 births
Living people
People from Vila Verde
Sportspeople from Braga District
Portuguese footballers
Association football wingers
Primeira Liga players
Segunda Divisão players
S.C. Braga players
FC Porto B players
FC Porto players
Vitória F.C. players
Rio Ave F.C. players
La Liga players
Segunda División players
Deportivo de La Coruña players
AD Alcorcón footballers
Ukrainian Premier League players
FC Dnipro players
Super League Greece players
Aris Thessaloniki F.C. players
Cypriot First Division players
AEK Larnaca FC players
Portugal youth international footballers
Portugal under-21 international footballers
Portuguese expatriate footballers
Expatriate footballers in Spain
Expatriate footballers in Ukraine
Expatriate footballers in Greece
Expatriate footballers in Cyprus
Portuguese expatriate sportspeople in Spain
Portuguese expatriate sportspeople in Ukraine
Portuguese expatriate sportspeople in Greece
Portuguese expatriate sportspeople in Cyprus